Patrik Bardhi (born 21 May 1998) is an Albanian professional footballer who plays as a forward for Albanian club Dinamo Tirana.

Club career

Tirana
Bardhi was promoted to Tirana's senior squad by manager Zé Maria during the 2017–18 season, featuring as an unused substitute in Tirana's 2–0 home defeat of Turbina Cërrik. He made his professional debut on 18 November 2017 in the 2–0 win over Apolonia Fier. His first score-sheet contributions came in his third appearance for the club, netting in the 84th minute of a 4–0 win at Naftëtari Kuçovë.

Bardhi ended his first season by making 12 league appearances and scoring twice as Tirana easily achieved promotion back to Albanian Superliga after only one season. Following the end of the season, Bardhi was not given a contract and he left as a free agent.

Kastrioti Krujë
On 9 August 2018, the newly promoted Albanian Superliga side Kastrioti Krujë announced to have signed Bardhi on a three-year deal. He initially came on trial before signing. He was given squad number 14, and made his club debut as well as his first top flight appearance on the opening day of 2018–19 Albanian Superliga against Luftëtari Gjirokastër on 18 August, winning a penalty kick after being fouled on zone which was successfully scored by Sokol Mziu for a 1–0 win.

Career statistics

Honours
Tirana
 Albanian First Division: 2017–18

References

External links
FSHF profile

1998 births
Living people
Footballers from Tirana
Albanian footballers
Association football forwards
Albania youth international footballers
KF Tirana players
KS Kastrioti players
Kategoria e Parë players
Kategoria Superiore players